Noronha is a family name that is found among some aristocratic families in Portugal, and in areas such as Brazil, India, Mozambique, Angola and Macau that were colonized by the Portuguese.

The family has its origins in the marriage of Alfonso Enríquez, Count of Gijón and Noreña (natural son of King Henry II of Castile) with Isabel of Portugal (natural daughter of King Ferdinand I of Portugal). Their marriage was one of the clauses of the Treaty of Santarém, signed in 1373 between the two peninsular kingdoms.

Alfonso was Count of Noreña, an Asturian village he had received from his father, and his children used the Portuguese spelling Noronha as their family name.

Notable people bearing the name include:
 Fernando de Noronha, 2nd Count of Vila Real (c. 1380–1445), son of Alfonso of Gijón-Noreña and Isabel of Portugal, Governor of Ceuta
 Francisco Noronha (1748–1787), botanist
 Fernão de Noronha (c. 1470 or earlier–c. 1540), corruption of the name of Portuguese explorer, Fernão de Loronha
 Osnar Noronha (born 1991), Peruvian footballer
 Ester Noronha,(born 1992), Indian actress and playback singer
 Alfredo Eduardo Barreto de Freitas Noronha (1918–2003), Brazilian footballer
Several Viceroys or Governors of Portuguese India:
 Garcia de Noronha, 1538–1540
 Afonso de Noronha, 1550–1554
 António de Noronha, 1564–1568
 António de Noronha o Catarraz, 1571–1573
 Miguel de Noronha, 4th Count of Linhares, 1629–1635
 Lourenço de Noronha, 1742–1744

See also
 Fernando de Noronha, Brazilian island group in the Atlantic Ocean

Portuguese-language surnames